Rock Band 2 is a 2008 music video game developed by Harmonix and distributed by MTV Games and Electronic Arts.  The game, a sequel to Rock Band, has been released for the Xbox 360, PlayStation 3, Wii and PlayStation 2. Rock Band allows one to four players to simulate the playing of rock music by providing the players with peripherals modeled after musical instruments (a guitar peripheral for lead guitar and bass gameplay, a drum peripheral, and a microphone). The gameplay in Rock Band 2 is nearly identical to the original Rock Band, while also comparable to that in Guitar Hero.

The game disc features 84 songs, all of which are master recordings.  In addition, the game supports existing downloadable content from Rock Band, as well as tracks which have been exported from other Rock Band game discs.  Twenty additional tracks were released exclusively for Rock Band 2 as free downloadable content after the game was released. A redeemable code that allows the player access to these songs is included with new copies of the game, except for the Wii version, where no code is required.

With Rock Band 3, Xbox 360, PlayStation 3, and Wii players could export 70 of 84 songs by purchasing an Export Key for US$9.99. The 9 songs from bands fronted by Harmonix staff members are not offered in the initial export package; however, these songs are offered at no cost in the "Rock Band Free 01" pack for the PlayStation 3 and Xbox 360, released on January 4, 2011. The export for the Xbox 360 and PlayStation 3 versions requires the code located on the back of the Rock Band 2 instruction manual; this is the same code used for the redemption of the aforementioned bonus content. The process for export differs slightly on both platforms: Xbox 360 users only need to redeem the manual code directly within Rock Band 3 while PlayStation 3 users must redeem the manual code on the Rock Band website and then use the code given from the website within Rock Band 3. EA support will accommodate users who may have lost or discarded their previous code. Wii users only need to have a Rock Band 2 save file present and pay the export fee to perform the export function; however, tracks are downloaded individually, allowing the user to delete unwanted songs. As of 2017, the ability to export Rock Band 2 to later Rock Band titles had expired; however, users who have previously exported Rock Band 2 are eligible to receive the songs in Rock Band 4.

Five songs were not exportable to Rock Band 3: "Let There Be Rock" by AC/DC, "Any Way You Want It" by Journey, "Battery" by Metallica, "Give It Away" by Red Hot Chili Peppers and "Spoonman" by Soundgarden. "Give It Away" and "Spoonman" were included as part of the Rock Band Blitz soundtrack, of which can be exported to Rock Band 3. The two songs were also later released as downloadable singles for Rock Band 3, and both are available with pro guitar and bass upgrades.

Track listing
Each of the 84 songs is categorized on-disc by difficulty (0 dots being the easiest and 5 red dots being the most difficult) for each instrument, as well as the entire band. Players can also choose from one of four skill levels (Easy, Medium, Hard, and Expert).  Unlike previous installments in the Guitar Hero and Rock Band series, the nine bonus songs are integrated with the other 75 songs in the game's track listing.

This song is offered in the "Rock Band Free 01" pack on Xbox 360 and PlayStation 3.
This song is included in the Rock Band Blitz soundtrack.
This song is also available as a downloadable single for Rock Band 3.
A live version of this song is available on the AC/DC Track Pack.

References

Rock Band 2